Ghitis is a surname. Notable people with the surname include:

Frida Ghitis, American journalist, a former CNN correspondent and producer
Salomón Lerner Ghitis (born 1946), Peruvian businessman and politician